Andrew Eric Law (born June 1966) is a British financier, hedge fund manager and philanthropist. He is the chairman, chief executive officer (CEO), and major shareholder of Caxton Associates, a hedge fund headquartered on Berkeley Square in London. He is a major donor to the Conservative Party.

Early life
Andrew Eric Law was born in June 1966, and raised in Cheadle Hulme near Stockport, England. His father was a mechanical engineer and his mother was a nurse. He was educated at Cheadle Hulme High School. He graduated from the University of Sheffield in Sheffield, South Yorkshire, with a First Class honours degree in Economics in 1987.

Career
He started his career in finance at County NatWest, now known as NatWest. He then worked as a trader at the Chemical Bank. In 1996, he joined Goldman Sachs, later becoming a managing director, where he oversaw FICC.

Caxton Associates 
He started working at Caxton Associates in London in 2003. In 2008, he became its chief investment officer. Since 2012, he has been its chairman and chief executive officer. Law is the company's main shareholder.

In 2017, Caxton Associates made £7.3 million profit, down from £95.8 million in 2016.

Political affiliations
Between May 2010 and January 2015, he donated £947,911 to the Conservative Party, making him its 11th biggest donor in this period. In May 2017, he gave £250,000 to the Conservative Party.

During the 2019 United Kingdom general election campaign Law donated £413,750 to the Conservative Party.

Philanthropy
He co-chairs the Law Family Charitable Foundation with his wife. They support many non-profit organisations, including the Policy Exchange, a think tank based in Westminster. In 2014, they donated £1 million to The Lowry in Salford, where the spaces inside the Main Gallery were renamed The Andrew and Zoë Law Galleries. In 2022, the Foundation provided the £8.1 million funding for the Lowry to purchase L.S.Lowry's Going to the Match, the 1953 painting of people on their way to watch a Bolton Wanderers match at the former Burnden Park stadium.

In 2021 the Law Family Charitable Foundation donated £5.85m to the University of Sheffield to launch a new student support programme and search for new therapies for a range of incurable and debilitating diseases.

In 2022, the Foundation donated £3million to the Science and Industry Museum in Manchester to fund the future of its Power Hall gallery, which will reopen in 2024. In the same year, the Foundation donated £2.9million to Factory International, a destination for arts, music and culture, commissioning and present a year-round programme of interdisciplinary work by leading artists, due to open in 2023.

Law is the chairman of the board of trustees of Speakers for Schools, which invites public speakers to state schools in the UK. He spoke at the Trinity C.E. High School in Manchester. He is on the board of trustees of Social Finance. Additionally, he is a patron of the Hotcourses Foundation, which helps vulnerable schoolchildren in Kenya.

In an op-ed published in The Huffington Post in 2014, he called for hedge fund managers to be more philanthropic.

Personal life
He is married to Zoë Law (née Purvis), a former make-up artist whose clients included Sienna Miller, and Emilia Fox and Tamara Mellon.  They have a house in west London.

She is now a photographer whose portfolio includes the exhibition LIFE, with portraits of 21 people who have cancer. The exhibition, which was displayed at The Lowry in Salford Quays in 2019, was set up to raise awareness of the cancer support provided by the Maggie's Centres. 

According to The Sunday Times Rich List in 2022, Law is worth £750 million.

He is a supporter of the football team, Manchester City F.C. He owns "Manchester City vs Sheffield United", a 1938 painting by L. S. Lowry.

References

Living people
People from Cheadle Hulme
Alumni of the University of Sheffield
Goldman Sachs people
British hedge fund managers
English financial businesspeople
English philanthropists
Conservative Party (UK) people
People educated at Cheadle Hulme School
1966 births
Conservative Party (UK) donors
Bankers from London